The 1930 County Championship was the 37th officially organised running of the County Championship. Lancashire County Cricket Club won the championship title for the sixth time.

Table
Eight points were awarded for a win
Four points were awarded for a tie
Five points for the side leading after the first innings of a drawn match
Three points for the side losing after the first innings of a drawn match
Four points for the sides if tied after the first innings of a drawn match
Four points for a no result on first innings (after more than six hours playing time)
If the weather reduces a match to less than six hours and there has not been a result on first innings then the match shall be void.

References

1930 in English cricket
County Championship seasons